Juniperus squamata, the flaky juniper, or Himalayan juniper is a species of coniferous shrub in the cypress family Cupressaceae, native to the Himalayas and China. 

It represents the provincial tree of Khyber Pakhtunkhwa (unofficial).

Description
The cones are berry-like, globose to ovoid, 4–9 mm long, and 4–6 mm diameter. Often, they are a glossy black and contain one seed; they are mature in about 18 months. The male cones are 3–4 mm long and shed their pollen in early spring. It is largely dioecious, with pollen and seed cones produced on separate plants, but occasionally monoecious.

Taxonomy
Three to five varieties are accepted, with treatment differing between different authors:
Juniperus squamata var. squamata – leaves mostly 5–9 mm. Throughout the standard range.
Juniperus squamata var. fargesii Rehder & E.H.Wilson – leaves mostly 3–5 mm. Confined to the eastern half of the range in China.
Juniperus squamata var. hongxiensis Y.F.Yu & L.K.Fu; often included in var. squamata.
Juniperus squamata var. parviflora Y.F.Yu & L.K.Fu; often included in var. squamata.

Juniperus morrisonicola  from Taiwan is often treated as a synonym, or a variety Juniperus squamata var. morrisonicola (Hayata) H.L.Li & H.Keng, but is better treated as a distinct species as it has a distinct DNA profile.

Etymology 
The Latin specific epithet squamata means small, scale-like leaves.

Distribution and habitat
It is found in (and native to) northeastern Afghanistan east to western Yunnan in southwestern China, with disjunct populations north to western Gansu, east to Fujian, and Taiwan. Recently, however, it was introduced to the United States in 1964 after being exported from the Netherlands.

Cultivation
Juniperus squamata is widely grown as an ornamental plant in Europe and North America, valued for its bluish foliage and compact habit. The following cultivars have gained the Royal Horticultural Society's Award of Garden Merit: 
'Blue Carpet' 
'Blue Star' 
'Holger'

References

Plants used in bonsai
squamata
Flora of Pakistan
Least concern plants